"Billion Dollar Babies" is a popular 1973 single by the rock group Alice Cooper, the title track taken from the album Billion Dollar Babies. It was released in July 1973, months after the album had been released. The track is a duet between Alice Cooper and Scottish musician Donovan, who provides the falsetto and high harmony vocals. BMI lists the composers of "Billion Dollar Babies" as Alice Cooper, Michael Bruce  and Reggie Vinson (a session guitarist who had worked with the Alice Cooper band previously).  Some sources list the composers as Cooper, Bruce, drummer Neal Smith, and "R. Reggie", the latter being an allusion to Vinson's nickname "Rockin' Reggie Vinson".

The Billion Dollar Babies album was the second to last recorded by the original Alice Cooper band, before singer Alice Cooper went solo.  Legal complications ensued; all five Alice Cooper band members had shared ownership of the band's name. Alice Cooper Band members Michael Bruce, Dennis Dunaway, and Neal Smith, along with additions Bob Dolin, Stu Daye and Mike Marconi, recorded as Billion Dollar Babies.  The band Billion Dollar Babies released only one album, 1977's Battle Axe, before disbanding.

Track listing
"Billion Dollar Babies" (Bruce, Cooper, Vinson) - 3:43
"Mary Ann" (Bruce, Cooper) - 2:21

Personnel
Alice Cooper – vocals
Steve Hunter – lead guitar
Dick Wagner – lead guitar
Michael Bruce – rhythm guitar
Dennis Dunaway – bass
Neal Smith – drums
Donovan – vocals

Charts

References

1973 singles
Songs written by Alice Cooper
Alice Cooper songs
Song recordings produced by Bob Ezrin
Warner Records singles